Devils Branch is a stream in the U.S. state of Georgia. It is a tributary to Little Persimmon Creek.

Devils Branch was so named on account of uneven terrain along its course.

References

Rivers of Georgia (U.S. state)
Rivers of Rabun County, Georgia